Madame Racketeer is a 1932 American pre-Code comedy film featuring Alison Skipworth, Richard Bennett and George Raft. The movie was directed by Harry Wagstaff Gribble and Alexander Hall. It was produced and distributed by Paramount Pictures.

Plot

Cast

 Alison Skipworth as Countess/Martha Hicks
 Richard Bennett as Elmer Hicks
 George Raft as Jack Houston
 John Breeden as David Butterworth
 Evalyn Knapp as Alice Hicks
 Gertrude Messinger as Patsy Hicks
 Robert McWade as 	James Butterworth
 J. Farrell MacDonald as John Adams
 Jessie Arnold as 	Frankie
 Anna Chandler as 	Stella 
 Oscar Apfel as J. Harrington Hagneya
 Arthur Hoyt as Shiffem 
 Irving Bacon as Gus, Desk Clerk 
 George Barbier as	Warden George Waddell 
 Frank Beal as Appleby, Bank Director
 Robert Homans as 	Chief of Police 
 Winter Hall as 	Minister 
 Ed Brady as Taxi Driver

Production
The film was based on an original screenplay based on the life of a real woman. It was sold under the title The Countess of Auburn. This was changed to The Sporting Widow then Madame Racketeer. In March 1932 Paramont announced Alison Skipworth would star.

In April 1932 Irving CUmmings signed to direct. George Raft was cast later that month. Raft had recently signed a long term contract with Paramount off the back of his strength of his work in Scarface but that film had not gone into wide release yet.

Numerous retakes were done after the film was completed.

The movie was one of 23 films put into receivership by Paramount in January 1933.

Reception
The New York Times said "part of it is funny, part of it is amusing enough and some of it is a little on the sadward side."

References

External links 
 
Madame Racketeer at BFI
Madame Racketeer at Letterbox DVD

1932 films
American black-and-white films
1932 comedy films
Paramount Pictures films
American comedy films
Films directed by Alexander Hall
1930s English-language films
1930s American films